Gahr may refer to:

Gahr High School, a high school in Cerritos, California, United States
David Gahr (1922–2008), American photographer

See also
Jonas Gahr Støre (born 1960), Norwegian politician